Fuente Rock is a low rock surmounted by a navigational beacon,  northeast of Ferrer Point in Discovery Bay, Greenwich Island, South Shetland Islands. The name derives from the form "Islote de la Fuente" appearing on a Chilean hydrographic chart of 1951.

References

Rock formations of Antarctica